Daisyworld, a computer simulation, is a hypothetical world orbiting a  star whose radiant energy is slowly increasing or decreasing. It is meant to mimic important elements of the Earth-Sun system, and was introduced by James Lovelock and Andrew Watson in a paper published in 1983 to illustrate the plausibility of the Gaia hypothesis.  In the original 1983 version, Daisyworld is seeded with two varieties of daisy as its only life forms: black daisies and white daisies. White petaled daisies reflect light, while black petaled daisies absorb light. The simulation tracks the two daisy populations and the surface temperature of Daisyworld as the sun's rays grow more powerful.   The surface temperature of Daisyworld remains almost constant over a broad range of solar output.

Mathematical model to sustain the Gaia hypothesis 

The purpose of the model is to demonstrate that feedback mechanisms can evolve from the actions or activities of self-interested organisms, rather than through classic group selection mechanisms. Daisyworld examines the energy budget of a planet populated by two different types of plants, black daisies and white daisies. The colour of the daisies influences the albedo of the planet such that black daisies absorb light and warm the planet, while white daisies reflect light and cool the planet. Competition between the daisies (based on temperature-effects on growth rates) leads to a balance of populations that tends to favour a planetary temperature close to the optimum for daisy growth.

Lovelock and Watson demonstrated the stability of Daisyworld by making its sun evolve along the main sequence, taking it from low to high solar constant. This perturbation of Daisyworld's receipt of solar radiation caused the balance of daisies to gradually shift from black to white but the planetary temperature was always regulated back to this optimum (except at the extreme ends of solar evolution). This situation is very different from the corresponding abiotic world, where temperature is unregulated and rises linearly with solar output.

Later versions of Daisyworld introduced a range of grey daisies, as well as populations of grazers and predators, and found that these further increased the stability of the homeostasis. More recently, other research, modeling the real biochemical cycles of Earth, and using various types of organisms (e.g. photosynthesisers, decomposers, herbivores and primary and secondary carnivores) has also been shown to produce Daisyworld-like regulation and stability, which helps to explain planetary biological diversity.

This enables nutrient recycling within a regulatory framework derived by natural selection amongst species, where one being's harmful waste becomes low energy food for members of another guild. This research on the Redfield ratio of nitrogen to phosphorus shows that local biotic processes can regulate global systems (See Keith  Downing & Peter Zvirinsky, The Simulated Evolution of Biochemical Guilds: Reconciling Gaia Theory with Natural Selection).

Original 1983 simulation synopsis 

At the beginning of the simulation, the sun's rays are weak and Daisyworld is too cold to support any life. Its surface is barren, and gray. As the luminosity of the sun's rays increases, germination of black daisies becomes possible. Because black daisies absorb more of the sun's radiant energy, they are able to increase their individual temperatures to healthy levels on the still cool surface of Daisyworld. As a result, they thrive and the population soon grows large enough to increase the average surface temperature of Daisyworld.

As the surface heats up, it becomes more habitable for white daisies, whose competing population grows to rival the black daisy population. As the two populations reach equilibrium, so too does the surface temperature of Daisyworld, which settles on a value most comfortable for both populations.

In this first phase of the simulation we see that black daisies have warmed Daisyworld so that it is habitable over a wider range of solar luminosity than would have been possible on a barren, gray planet. This allowed growth of the white daisy population, and the two populations of daisies are now working together to regulate the surface temperature.

The second phase of the simulation documents what happens as the sun's luminosity continues to increase, heating the surface of Daisyworld beyond a comfortable range for the daisies. This temperature increase causes white daisies, who are better able to stay cool because of their high albedo or ability to reflect sunlight, to gain a selective advantage over the black daisies. White daisies begin replacing black daisies, which has a cooling effect on Daisyworld. The result is that Daisyworld's surface temperature remains habitable - in fact almost constant - even as the luminosity of the sun continues to increase.

In the third phase of the simulation, the sun's rays have grown so powerful that soon even the white daisies can no longer survive. At a certain luminosity their population crashes, and the barren, gray surface of Daisyworld, no longer able to reflect the sun's rays, rapidly heats up.

At this point in the simulation solar luminosity is programmed to decline, retracing its original path to its initial value. Even as it declines to levels that previously supported vast populations of daisies in the third phase, no daisies are able to grow because the surface of barren, gray Daisyworld is still far too hot. Eventually, the sun's rays decrease in power to a more comfortable level which allows white daisies to grow, who begin cooling the planet.

Relevance to Earth 

Because Daisyworld is so simplistic, having for example, no atmosphere, no animals, only one species of plant life, and only the most basic population growth and death models, it should not be directly compared to Earth. This was stated very clearly by the original authors. Even so, it provided a number of useful predictions of how Earth's biosphere may respond to, for example, human interference. Later adaptations of Daisyworld (discussed below), which added many layers of complexity, still showed the same basic trends of the original model.

One prediction of the simulation is that the biosphere works to regulate the climate, making it habitable over a wide range of solar luminosity. Many examples of these regulatory systems have been found on Earth.

Modifications to the original simulation 

Daisyworld was designed to refute the idea that there was something inherently mystical about the Gaia hypothesis that Earth's surface displays homeostatic and homeorhetic properties similar to those of a living organism. Specifically, thermoregulation was addressed. The Gaia hypothesis had attracted a substantial amount of criticism from scientists such as Richard Dawkins, who argued that planet-level thermoregulation was impossible without planetary natural selection, which might involve evidence of dead planets that did not thermoregulate. Dr. W. Ford Doolittle rejected the notion of planetary regulation because it seemed to require a "secret consensus" among organisms, thus some sort of inexplicable purpose on a planetary scale. Incidentally, neither of these neoDarwinians made a close examination of the wide-ranging evidence presented in Lovelock's books that was suggestive of planetary regulation, dismissing the theory based on what they saw as its incompatibility with the latest views on the processes by which evolution works. Lovelock's model countered the criticism that some "secret consensus" would be required for planetary regulation by showing how in this model thermoregulation of the planet, beneficial to the two species, arises naturally.

Later criticism of Daisyworld itself centers on the fact that although it is often used as an analogy for Earth, the original simulation leaves out many important details of the true Earth system. For example, the system requires an ad-hoc death rate (γ) to sustain homeostasis, and it does not take into account the difference between species-level phenomena and individual level phenomena. Detractors of the simulation believed inclusion of these details would cause it to become unstable, and therefore, false. Many of these issues are addressed in a 2001 paper by Timothy Lenton and James Lovelock, which shows that inclusion of these factors actually improves Daisyworld's ability to regulate its climate.

Biodiversity and stability of ecosystems

The importance of the large number of species in an ecosystem, led to two sets of views about the role played by biodiversity in the stability of ecosystems in Gaia theory. In one school of thought labelled the "species redundancy" hypothesis, proposed by Australian ecologist Brian Walker, most species are seen as having little contribution overall in the stability, comparable to the passengers in an aeroplane who play little role in its successful flight. The hypothesis leads to the conclusion that only a few key species are necessary for a healthy ecosystem. The "rivet-popper" hypothesis put forth by Paul R. Ehrlich and his wife Anne H. Ehrlich compares each species forming part of an ecosystem with a rivet on the aeroplane (represented by the ecosystem). The progressive loss of species mirrors the progressive loss of rivets from the plane, weakening it till it is no longer sustainable and crashes.

Later extensions of the Daisyworld simulation which included rabbits, foxes and other species, led to a surprising finding that the larger the number of species, the greater the improving effects on the entire planet (i.e., the temperature regulation was improved). It also showed that the system was robust and stable even when perturbed. Daisyworld simulations where environmental changes were stable gradually became less diverse over time; in contrast gentle perturbations led to bursts of species richness. These findings lent support to the idea that biodiversity is valuable.

This finding was supported by a 1994 study of the factors species composition, dynamics and diversity in successional and native grasslands in Minnesota by David Tilman and John A. Downing which concluded that "primary productivity in more diverse plant communities is more resistant to, and recovers more fully from, a major drought". They go on to add "Our results support the diversity stability hypothesis but not the alternative hypothesis that most species are functionally redundant".

See also
 Gaia hypothesis
 Gaia philosophy
 SimEarth, a video game partially based on the Daisyworld simulation

References

Further reading

External links
 Online DaisyWorld simulator, with many options (HTML5/Javascript)
 Java Applet for daisyworld on a 2D space
Spatial Daisyworld Model Java Applet and explanation of Daisyworld with evolution
 A Unix/X11 simulation of Daisyworld.
 Modeling the Gaia Hypothesis: DaisyWorld A test applet of a basic Daisyworld model using a 2D cellular automata.
 Card, O.S., Xenocide (science fiction novel, sequel to Ender's Game and Speaker for the Dead, Tor, Aug 1991)
 A NetLogo version of the Daisyworld model.

Climate modeling
Ecological experiments
Homeostasis
Articles containing video clips